Morningside railway station served the village of Morningside, North Lanarkshire, Scotland from 1844 to 1930 on the Wilsontown, Morningside and Coltness Railway.

History 
The station opened in October 1844 by the Wilsontown, Morningside and Coltness Railway. It closed in 1848 when the Caledonian Railway opened. It reopened on 19 September 1864. To the north was the goods yard and further north was a turntable. At the east end was a signal box. There was a line north east which served Coltness Iron Works. The station closed on 1 May 1930.

References

External links 

Disused railway stations in North Lanarkshire
Former North British Railway stations
Railway stations in Great Britain opened in 1844
Railway stations in Great Britain closed in 1930
1844 establishments in Scotland
1930 disestablishments in Scotland